Frédéric Petit (Muret, 1810 – Toulouse, 1865) was a French astronomer.  He was the first director of the Toulouse Observatory, located in Toulouse, France, serving from 1838 to 1865.  In 1846 he announced that he had discovered a second moon of Earth. The theory was later dismissed by his peers, although the concept of a second smaller satellite of the Earth was used by Jules Verne in his novel From the Earth to the Moon.

References 

1810 births
1865 deaths
19th-century French astronomers